Paula Reinoso (born 19 March 1973) is an Argentine sailor. She competed at the 1996 Summer Olympics, the 2000 Summer Olympics, and the 2004 Summer Olympics.

References

External links
 

1973 births
Living people
Argentine female sailors (sport)
Olympic sailors of Argentina
Sailors at the 1996 Summer Olympics – 470
Sailors at the 2000 Summer Olympics – 470
Sailors at the 2004 Summer Olympics – 470
Sportspeople from Buenos Aires